Tuomo Lassila (born 1965) is a Finnish musician best known as the former drummer, founder member and co-songwriter of the power metal band Stratovarius and currently the drummer and percussionist for the Finnish metal band Conquest.

Music career
Lassila was one of the original founding members of "Black Water" (early Stratovarius name), the others being bassist John Vihervä and guitarist Staffan Stråhlman. He is credited with coming up with the band's current name after combining the words "Stratocaster" and "Stradivarius". In 1985, Stråhlman quit the band and Lassila approached guitarist Timo Tolkki to fill in the position. During his time with the band, he was (besides Tolkki) the band's co-leader and secondary songwriter (primarily during the first two albums) and also the only original member remaining in the band before leaving in late 1995 after the Fourth Dimension tour, along with original keyboardist Antti Ikonen due to creative disagreements with Tolkki over the direction the band was heading and, also possibly, personal chemistry. After leaving Stratovarius he temporarily retired from performing and graduated as percussionist from Sibelius Academy in 1997.

In 1998, he joined the Finnish band Conquest, led by Peter James Goodman and played drums in their first album Worlds Apart (released in 1999) and also in a tribute (with Conquest) to Iron Maiden, playing in the song "The Evil That Men Do" on the tribute album Slave to the Power which was released in 2000. Conquest subsequently disbanded in 2002 and Lassila dedicated to play in orchestral projects.

He rejoined a reformed Conquest in 2011, initially as a guest member in their second album "The Harvest" (their first in almost 12 years) but at the end of the year, he again became a full-time member after the departure of drummer Ville Siuruainen and is currently touring with the band in a small tour within Finland.

On 28 October 2013 it was announced that Tuomo Lassila will be the drummer for the second album of his former Stratovarius bandmate Timo Tolkki's metal opera Avalon. A few weeks later, on 23 November, it was also announced that Antti Ikonen is also joining the project, being the first time the three original members of Stratovarius reunite to make music in nearly in 20 years.

Discography

Stratovarius
1989: Fright Night
1992: Twilight Time
1994: Dreamspace
1995: Fourth Dimension

Timo Tolkki
1994: Classical Variations and Themes

Conquest
1999: Worlds Apart
2011: The Harvest

Timo Tolkki's Avalon 
2014: Angels of the Apocalypse

References

1965 births
Living people
Finnish heavy metal drummers
Stratovarius members